Topologika Software Ltd was an independent British publisher of educational software. Established in Stilton, Cambridgeshire in 1983, the company spent most of its life in Penryn, Cornwall before moving to Brighton, Sussex. The company was dissolved at the end of June 2013. Its educational software continues to be sold by distributors REM via, and is still supported by Topologika's founder Brian Kerslake. One of the educational software products was Music Box.

Many of its early products were interactive fiction adventure games taken on after Acornsoft was sold to Superior Software who only continued to release their arcade games. Two of its first releases were Countdown to Doom and Philosopher's Quest, written by Peter Killworth. The versions produced by Topologika were large scale improvements upon the originals.

The complete list of adventure games produced by Topologika was as follows:
Acheton
Avon
Countdown to Doom
Giant Killer
Hezarin
Kingdom of Hamil
Monsters of Murdac
Philosopher's Quest
Return to Doom
Sellardore Tales
Spy Snatcher
Stig of the Dump
The Last Days of Doom

Topologika has itself now ceased publishing interactive fiction other than as an element of its ongoing and growing range of educational software which now includes Marshal Anderson's interactive fiction on CD and for VLEs (Sellardore Tales and Stig of the Dump) and Peter Killworth's maths adventure GiantKiller.

References

External links
 Topologika's website
 
 List Of Topologika Adventures For The PC
 The classic (Maths-based) adventure GIANTKILLER by Peter Killworth - FREE download
 Info on Sellardore Tales
 Info on Stig of the Dump
 Stig and Sellardore's author

Computer companies of the United Kingdom
Educational software companies